Danny Lima (born 27 July 1975) is a Samoan former professional rugby league footballer who played as a  in the 1990s and 2000s. He was a Samoa international.

Background
Lima was born in Samoa.

Playing career
Lima played at club level in Australasia for the Otahuhu Leopards, the Auckland City Vulcans, the Sydney Roosters, the Canberra Raiders, the Manly Sea Eagles, the Northern Eagles with whom he played in the club's last ever game a 68–28 loss against Penrith and Melbourne Storm, and in the Super League for the Warrington Wolves, the Salford City Reds and the Wakefield Trinity Wildcats.

Lima coached at Warrington Wizards before taking up a playing role in France. He played for RC Albi in France, but left after club went under liquidation, as well as SO Avignon.

References

External links
Wildcats squad: Danny Lima
Statistics at stats.rleague.com
Lima handed Wizards coaching role
Statistics at rleague.com

1975 births
Living people
Auckland rugby league team players
Canberra Raiders players
Expatriate rugby league players in Australia
Expatriate rugby league players in England
Expatriate rugby league players in France
Expatriate rugby league players in New Zealand
Junior Kiwis players
Manly Warringah Sea Eagles players
Northern Eagles players
Otahuhu Leopards players
Racing Club Albi XIII players
Rugby league props
Salford Red Devils players
Samoa national rugby league team players
Samoan expatriate rugby league players
Samoan expatriate sportspeople in Australia
Samoan expatriate sportspeople in England
Samoan expatriate sportspeople in France
Samoan expatriate sportspeople in New Zealand
Samoan rugby league players
Sporting Olympique Avignon players
Sydney Roosters players
Wakefield Trinity players
Warrington Wolves players